Thibaut Jean-Marie Michel Berland (born October 5, 1981), known professionally as Breakbot, is a French musician, record producer and a DJ who has been signed with Ed Banger Records since May 2009.

Career
Breakbot studied at Supinfocom, a computer graphics university. He co-directed the short film Overtime with Oury Atlan and Damien Ferrié. The short won the Ottawa International Animation Festival award for "Best Graduate Film" in 2005 and the Internationales Trickfilmfestival Stuttgart "Young Animation Award" in 2006. Thibaut Berland also prepared advertisements and videos.

In 2007, he participated in the graphic design of the spaceship present on the first album of the group Justice, Cross. Through his involvement with the design, he was introduced to Pedro Winter, founder of the label Ed Banger Records, who signed him.

Breakbot is most recognized for his remixes. His reworkings of songs by artists including Röyksopp, Digitalism, and Chromeo are among his most popular. The music video of "Baby I'm Yours" featuring Irfane was directed by Irina Dakeva and became a summer hit MTV Pulse, France. The music video was nominated for "Best budget pop/dance/urban video" and "Best animation in a video" during the UK Music Video Awards on October 12, 2010.

In February 2016, he released his second album, Still Waters, composed and produced with his frequent collaborator, Christopher Irfane Khan-Acito ("Irfane"). His track Star Tripper was included in Star Wars Headspace, a Star-Wars themed music album released by Disney.

In popular culture

His 2008 remix of Pnau's song "Baby" appears in Gran Turismo 5, a racing video game. Another one of his songs, "Penelope Pitstop", also features in the game. The song "Get Lost" appears in the 2016 racing video game Forza Horizon 3.

Breakbot's position in popular culture is influenced by the similarities between "Baby I'm Yours" and 2012 chart hit "Treasure" by Bruno Mars. "Treasure" was re-registered in ASCAP with new writing credits, which included him and Irfane Khan-Acito, due to the similarities with the former song. In May 2013, during an interview in Tiny Mix Tapes, Breakbot explained that the boss of Because Music had mentioned, a year previously, that Mars wanted to cover "Baby I'm Yours". As Breakbot was busy finishing the album, however, "it did not happen". Breakbot called "Treasure" a "rip-off" of his song, however, he was "cool with it"; he explained that he also had many influences on his music "with lots of bits taken from here and there".

In late 2018, his single "Baby I'm Yours" became an Internet meme commonly paired with a voice clip of Paul Bremer announcing Saddam Hussein's capture, with his famous words: "Ladies and gentlemen, we got him." It was also paired with a clip known as "How to Smokebomb a Party" which parodies the breaching techniques of the FBI, though said clip has been renamed due to its breaching sequence becoming an Internet meme itself.

Discography

Studio albums

EPs

Singles

Songwriting and production credits

Remixes

Features and collaborations

Mixes
Breakbot Summer mix @ Le Mouv' radio 2014
Breakbot Beatport Live
Breakbot MixTape: October 2012
Disco Mini Mix: Dance on Glass 
BBC In New DJ we Trust Heroes Mix
Valentine Mixtape
Breakbot Le Mouv' radio 2012
Annie Mac Minimix
TILT! Megamix
The Lazy Sunday Selecta Mixtape
Ed Banger, part 3 avec Breakbot | Novaplanet Mix
Bedtime Stories
Another Mixtape 2018
Lockdown Boogie
"By Your Side" Anniversary Mixtape

Filmography
2005: Overtime (short) -- directed by Oury Atlan, Thibaut Berland and Damien Ferrie

Notes

References

Living people
1981 births
French DJs
French record producers
French house musicians
Electro musicians
Boogie musicians
Nu-disco musicians
Remixers
Because Music artists